"Hail! South Dakota!" is the regional anthem of South Dakota, selected by popular vote as the official state song. It was written and composed by DeeCort Hammitt (1893-1970).

Lyrics
Hail! South Dakota! a great state of the land;
Health, wealth and beauty, that's what makes her grand;
She has her Black Hills, and mines with gold so rare,
And with her scenery, no other state can compare.

Come where the sun shines, and where life's worth your while;
You won't be here long, till you'll wear a smile;
No state's so healthy, and no folk quite so true.
To South Dakota we welcome you.

Hail! South Dakota! the state we love the best,
Land of our fathers, builders of the west;
Home of the Badlands, and Rushmore's ageless shrine,
Black Hills and prairies, farmland and sunshine.
Hills, farms and prairies, blessed with bright sunshine.

Notes

References

1943 songs
Music of South Dakota
Songs about South Dakota
South Dakota Coyotes
Symbols of South Dakota
South Dakota